Smart Bangladesh is an initiative led by the Government of Bangladesh aiming to transform Bangladesh into a technologically advanced and sustainable society. Building on the foundation of the Digital Bangladesh initiative, Smart Bangladesh envisions the development of smart cities, smart agriculture, smart healthcare, smart education, smart energy, smart governance and smart institutions with the ultimate goal of creating a more prosperous, equitable, and sustainable future for the people of Bangladesh.

Pillars of Smart Bangladesh
1. Smart Citizens

2. Smart Government

3. Smart Economy 

4. Smart Society

5. Smart Environment

References 

Bangladesh
Smart Communications